Ahmed Al-Khater (born 16 December 1985) is a Saudi Arabian footballer who currently plays as a defender.

References

External links
 

Saudi Arabian footballers
Al-Taraji Club players
Al-Raed FC players
Al-Hazem F.C. players
Abha Club players
Al-Kawkab FC players
Al-Nahda Club (Saudi Arabia) players
Hajer FC players
Arar FC players
Al Jandal Club players
1985 births
Living people
Saudi First Division League players
Saudi Professional League players
Saudi Second Division players
Saudi Fourth Division players
Association football defenders